The 1888 World Series was an end-of-the-year professional baseball season championship playoff series between the National League champion New York Giants and the old American Association champion St. Louis Browns.

The Giants won, 6 games to 4. Hall of Fame pitcher Tim Keefe went 4–0.

This was the Browns' last appearance in a championship tournament and pre-modern-era World Series, the last of their four consecutive AA pennants. The club would later join the NL in 1892 and be renamed as the St. Louis Cardinals by 1900. It would be 1926 before they would win their next league pennant.

Game summary

Game 1

Game 2

Game 3

Game 4

Game 5

Game 6

Game 7

Game 8

Game 9

Game 10

Series stats

New York Giants

Batting

Pitching

St. Louis Browns

Batting

Pitching

Series summary

World Series
World Series
New York Giants (NL) postseason
St. Louis Browns
World Series
World Series
Baseball competitions in New York City
Baseball competitions in Philadelphia
Baseball competitions in St. Louis
World Series
19th century in Manhattan
Washington Heights, Manhattan